Lockerbie railway station lies on the West Coast Main Line between  and Carstairs in Lockerbie, Dumfries and Galloway, Scotland. The station is owned by Network Rail.

History 
A branch line from here to  via Lochmaben was completed in September 1863 – this was constructed by the independent Dumfries, Lochmaben & Lockerbie Railway, but was absorbed by the Caledonian company two years later. Though this route allowed the Caledonian company to reach Dumfries and thus compete with the rival Glasgow and South Western Railway, it never developed beyond country branch status.

On 4 May 1882, an accident occurred when the branch service from Stranraer via the Dumfries, Lochmaben and Lockerbie Railway passed a signal and entered the station at 23:25. It collided at low speed, with a goods train already on the northbound line. This collision, though minor, forced carriages from the goods train onto the southbound line and into the path of the speeding Glasgow Express which smashed into the wreckage and derailed onto the station platform. Seven people were killed, including the driver and fireman of the express. The guard from the express ran down the line to warn another approaching train of the accident and prevented a further collision. There were 300 injuries. The driver of the first train, the Lockerbie station master and the local inspection regime were all criticised for their actions in the subsequent report on the crash.

The branch to Dumfries was closed to passenger services by the British Transport Commission in May 1952.  Goods traffic continued until 1966, when the line fell victim to the Beeching Axe.  Except Lockerbie all other local stations on the main line between Carlisle and Carstairs closed during the 1960s. The first electrically operated passenger services operated by British Rail in May 1974 when the West Coast Main Line electrification project between Weaver Junction & Glasgow was completed.

Services northwards to Glasgow and Edinburgh were suspended in January 2016 and replaced by buses, whilst major repairs were carried out the River Clyde viaduct at Lamington that was damaged by Storm Frank.  Trains resumed on 22 February 2016.

Stationmasters

James Chesney from 1863 (formerly station master at Beattock)
John Wallace 1875 - 1881
John Stothart 1881 - 1883 (formerly station master at West Calder)
David Wightman 1883 - 1901 (formerly station master at Busby)
Kenneth Wilson 1901 - 1905 (formerly station master at Kelvinbridge)
Samuel Kerr 1905 - 1914 (formerly station master at Uddingston, afterwards station master at Lanark)
William Steele 1914 - 1924 (formerly station master at Peebles)
John Dickson 1924 - 1925 (formerly station master at Peebles)
William Scougall 1925 - 1931 (formerly station master at Peebles)
William Tinning from 1931  (formerly station master at Newmains)
James W. Collins 1938 - 1939 (formerly station master at Dumbarton, afterwards station master at Stirling)
William Copland 1948 - 1949 (formerly station master at Gleneagles)
David M.Tyndall 1949 - 1958 (formerly station master at Brechin)

Services and current operations 

Lockerbie station is managed by ScotRail although the company does not provide any services to or from the station. Lockerbie is one of only two railway stations in Scotland that are not served by ScotRail (the other being Reston). All services are provided by Avanti West Coast and TransPennine Express.

TransPennine Express
TransPennine Express provide most services, As of 2022 this is as follows: There is an hourly service to Manchester Airport, a two hourly service to Edinburgh Waverley (with one larger gap meaning a four hour gap between services) and a two hourly service to Glasgow Central (with hourly departures in the morning between 7AM and 12PM). 

Most services are run using Class 397 Civity trains, however a small number of services between Manchester and Edinburgh are run using Class 802 IET trains (as of 16th May 2022).

Avanti West Coast
Avanti West Coast operate six daily services. There are three trains per day to Glasgow Central, two to London Euston and one to Crewe. On Sundays, there are three Avanti trains that call at Lockerbie, providing services to Glasgow Central, London Euston and Crewe.

Avanti West Coast services are provided using a combination of Class 390 Pendolino and Class 221 Super Voyager trains.

References

Notes

Sources 
 
 
 
 RAILSCOT on Caledonian Railway
 Lockerbie railway station on navigable OS map

External links

Railway stations in Dumfries and Galloway
Former Caledonian Railway stations
Railway stations in Great Britain opened in 1847
Railway stations served by TransPennine Express
Railway stations served by Avanti West Coast
1847 establishments in Scotland
William Tite railway stations
Lockerbie
Railway stations in Great Britain not served by their managing company
Stations on the West Coast Main Line